Skytide is a reporting and analytics company whose software applications measure the performance of streaming video.   Skytide is notable because its software is facilitating the trend by telecommunications service providers (TSPs) to operate their own content delivery networks (CDNs), in an effort to generate additional revenue from the increasing volume of video flowing over their broadband networks.
In December 2013, Skytide was acquired by Citrix Systems Inc.

Patents

Skytide holds U.S. patents 7,630,956 and 8,346,811, covering its proprietary method for analyzing and reporting extensible data from multiple sources in multiple formats.

Honors & Recognition

 Selected by Gartner as "Cool Vendor" in Communication Service Provider Infrastructure 
 Winner of the 2009 Streaming Media Reader’s Choice Award 
 Winner of the 7th Annual eWeek Excellence Awards 
 Winner of 2007 Red Herring 100 award

See also
 IPTV
 Over-the-top content (OTT)
 Internet television
 Connected TV
 Online video analytics
 Web log analysis software
 Web analytics

References

External links
 Skytide
Granite Ventures
"4 Keys to Telco CDN Success" white paper
"6 Online Video Trends to Watch in 2013" white paper
"Online Video Trends to Watch in 2014" white paper
"How Telcos & ISPs Can Learn to Love OTT" white paper
"What Every Service Provider Should Know About Federated CDNs" white paper
"Improving CDN Capacity Utilization with Peak-Load Pricing" white paper

Citrix Systems
Streaming media systems